Kingsboro (also Kingsborough) is a neighborhood in the northern part of the city of Gloversville, and an adjacent unincorporated community in the town of Johnstown in Fulton County, New York, United States.

Notes

Hamlets in Fulton County, New York
Hamlets in New York (state)